Paul-Jean-Jacques Lacôme d'Estalenx (4 March 1838 – 12 December 1920) was a French composer. Between 1870 and the turn of the century he produced a series of operettas and operas-bouffes that were popular both in France and abroad. Interest in his works revived briefly during the First World War, when they were successfully revived in Paris.

Biography
Lacôme was born in Le Houga, Gers, in Gascony, the only child of an artistic and musical family. He became a competent player of the piano, flute, cornet, cello and ophicleide, and studied with the organist José Puig y Absubide in Aire-sur-Adour between 1857 and 1860. He won a prize, in a magazine competition, with an operetta, Le dernier des paladins, which was to have been presented at the Théâtre des Bouffes Parisiens, but the policy of the theatre changed and the piece was not staged.

Lacôme settled in Paris, where he wrote music criticism and had more than 20 operettas performed between 1870 and the end of the century. His operetta La Dot mal placée ("The Misplaced Dowry", 1873) was a hit abroad as well as in Paris. It played 117 times in Barcelona, and had similar runs in Naples, Madrid and Austria. Madame Boniface was given in Montreal in 1885. Ma mie Rosette (1890) was his biggest success in Britain in 1892, starring Jessie Bond and Courtice Pounds, among others, with additional music by Ivan Caryll. In France, the most successful of his shows was Jeanne, Jeannette et Jeanneton (1876), which ran for more than 200 performances despite having a libretto previously rejected by Offenbach.

In addition to his operas, Lacôme composed songs, chamber music and orchestral works, including a ballet, Le rêve d'Elias (1899), which ran for more than 100 performances in Paris and had a similar run in London. To mark the centenary of the French Revolution in 1889, he conceived the idea of reviving the operas of the revolutionary era, reorchestrating them to suit modern tastes. Under his supervision there were revivals of Paisiello's The Barber of Seville and Dalayrac's Raoul, sire de Créqui and La soirée orageuse at the Opéra Comique.

In 1901 Lacôme retired, returning to live at the family house at Le Houga. He became a local benefactor, endowing the church and founding a music school at Mont-de-Marsan nearby, where he taught until 1912. He was made a Chevalier of the Legion of Honour. Some of Lacôme's works were revived in Paris during the First World War, when, as one commentator put it, the French craved reminders of a happier era. Between 1914 and 1918 there were revivals of Ma mie Rosette and Jeanne, Jeannette et Jeanneton, and two revivals of Madame Boniface.

Lacôme died at his house in Le Houga at the age of 82.

Paul Lacôme has sometimes been confused with his fellow composer Paul Lacombe (1837–1927). Some of Lacôme's scores, including La fille de l'air and Les quatre filles Aymon, were published as composed by "Paul Lacombe".

Works
Lacôme's operettas are listed below, with the names of the librettists and dates of Paris premières:

L’épicier par amour, 1 act, 1870
J’veux mon peignoir, 1 act, Georges Mancel, 1872 
En Espagne, 1 act, Mancel, 1872
La dot mal placée, 3 acts, Mancel, 1873
Le mouton enragé, 1 act, Adolphe Jaime and Jules Noriac, 1873
Amphytrion, 1 act, C. Nuitter and Beaumont, 1875
Jeanne Jeannette et Jeanneton, 3 acts, Charles Clairville and Alfred Delacour, 1876 (retitled The Marquis in the United States)
Pâques fleuries, 3 acts, Clairville and Delacour, 1879
Le beau Nicolas, 3 acts, Albert Vanloo and Eugène Letterier, 1880
La nuit de Saint Jean, 1 act, M. de Lua-Lusignan and Delacour, after Erckmann-Chatrian, 1882
Madame Boniface, 3 acts, Clairville and Ernest Depré, 1883
Myrtille, 4 acts, Emile Erckmann, Alexandre Chatrian and Maurice Drack, 1885
Les saturnales, 3 acts, Albin Valabrègue, 1887
La gardeuse d’oies, 3 acts, Letterier and Vanloo, 1888
Ma mie Rosette, 3 acts, Jules Préval and Armand Liorat, 1890
La fille de l’air, opérette fantastique in 4 acts and 7 tableaux, Coignard brothers, after Liorat, 1890
Mademoiselle Asmodée (music by Lacôme and Victor Roger), 3 acts, P. Ferrier and Clairville, 1891
Le cadeau de noces, 4 acts, Liorat, Stop and A. Hue, 1893 
Le bain de Monsieur, 1 act, J. Pradels and Mancel, 1895 
La fiancée en loterie (music by Lacôme and André Messager), 3 acts, A. Douane and C. de Roddaz, 1896 *Le maréchal Chaudron, 3 acts, Henri Chivot and Jean Gascogne, 1898
Les quatre filles Aymon (music by Lacôme and Victor Roger), 3 acts, Liorat and Albert Fontenay, 1898

Notes

References

External links
 

People from Gers
1838 births
1920 deaths
French opera composers
Male opera composers
French male classical composers
French operetta composers